Guayacanes is a village in the municipality of Majagua, Ciego de Ávila Province, Cuba.

Overview
The village, originally part of the municipality of Ciego de Ávila, is located between the city and Majagua. It counts a railway station on the Havana-Santa Clara-Camagüey-Santiago line and is located just in south of the Carretera Central.

References

External links 

Guayacanes at guije.com
Map of Guayacanes at nona.net
Guayacanes on Google Maps

Populated places in Ciego de Ávila Province